Dhoper chop  is a snack originating from the Indian subcontinent, in West Bengal preparation, it is a huge egg-shaped snack in a bread jacket with ketchup and onion salad and sometimes with a cup of tea. It is a pure a Bengali dish (Chop).

Etymology
The word "Dhop" is a Bengali word which means " a lie" and the word "chop" means a small cutletfritters or Croquette in Bengali. Milon Kanti Dey told "The telegraph" during an interview in the year 2007 “Students request me to prepare anything that they like at the canteen. Some of them must have had bread pakoras elsewhere and I had tried to make it for them. When they tasted it and asked me what should I call it, I asked them to name it and they called it Dhoper (a lie) Chop,
I make a jacket of bread and fill it with stuffing of potato, sometimes blended with chicken or mutton. It is dipped into a mixture of flour, butter and egg and fried.”

Origin
The exact origin of the snack is Jadavpur University's Milonda's canteen, and the time invented is a winter month in the year 1972. Milon Kanti Dey is known as the inventor of the snack. When he was alive, he often told students of Jadhavpur, how he stumbled upon Dhoper Chop. Some students of the Arts Department asked him one day to do something new. He made a bread pakora in new style and stuffed it with meat. He is also an inventor of different types of Bengali snacks which are unnamed till today.

Ingredients
Ingredients vary according to the region and the type of meat or vegetables used. Potatoes, and sometimes meat are prime ingredient with white bread. The spices used in Dhoper Chop  may include onion, green chilies, pepper, cumin powder, garam masala powder, Kashmiri chili powder, coriander powder, salt, ghee, butter or any vegetable oil. The dish may be served with onion, salad, ketchup, fried potatoes, and sometimes with a cup of tea.

See also

References

Potato dishes
Indian snack foods
Indian fast food